John Joseph Burns (May 13, 1880 – June 24, 1957) was an American second baseman who played two seasons in Major League Baseball (MLB) with the Detroit Tigers. He played in the minors through 1911 and had three stints as a manager in the minors, in 1904, 1913 and 1920.

Sources

Detroit Tigers players
Major League Baseball second basemen
Baseball players from Pennsylvania
1880 births
1957 deaths
Batavia Giants players
Geneva Alhambras players
Wilkes-Barre Coal Barons players
Kansas City Blues (baseball) players
Dayton Veterans players
Dayton Old Soldiers players
Grand Rapids Furniture Makers players
Minneapolis Millers (baseball) players
Toledo Mud Hens managers
Toledo Mud Hens players
San Francisco (minor league baseball) players
San Francisco Seals (baseball) players
San Francisco Pirates players
Everett Smokestackers players
Seattle Siwashes players
Indianapolis Indians players
Lowell Tigers players
New Britain Perfectos players
Northampton Meadowlarks players
Waterbury Champs players